Plaça de les Glòries Catalanes, most often shortened to Glòries, is a large square in Barcelona, first designed by Ildefons Cerdà to serve as the city centre in his original urban plan (Pla Cerdà), but nowadays relegated to quite a secondary position. It is located in the Sant Martí district, bordering Eixample, at the junction of three of the city's most important thoroughfares: Avinguda Diagonal, Avinguda Meridiana and Gran Via de les Corts Catalanes. Currently it serves largely as a roundabout of elevated highways. However, beginning in the early 2000s, and as of 2007, revamping project for Glòries has started, which is aimed to give the square a new role in Barcelona and revitalize the northern districts of the city, under the name 22@. These plans supplement other large-scale plans in Sagrera and the Fòrum area. The first installment of this project was the construction of the controversial Torre Agbar skyscraper.

History 

Plaça de les Glòries, which was then well outside the city, was originally featured in the mid-19th-century Cerdà plan for Barcelona, intended as a large public square in a new city centre, but it remained sparsely developed, turning into one of Barcelona's major road and railway junctions. Eventually the railways were closed or went underground, and around 1990 the road junction was reshaped into the current large elevated roundabout with a park at its centre, with pedestrian access beneath the roads.

In March 2016, ongoing excavations as part of the area's redevelopment uncovered extensive remains of el Rec Comtal, an important aqueduct possibly dating back to Roman times, which until the mid-20th century brought water from the Besòs river to the city.

Current uses 
Large portions of the square are occupied by parking lots and its central area is surrounded by concrete walls, part of the not very aesthetic elevated highways. The rest of the square hosts a shopping centre (the Centre Comercial Glòries), a secondary school (IES Salvador Espriu), and the Torre Agbar. The square also serves as the venue for one of the city's most renowned traditional open-air marketplaces, Els Encants Vells.

Els Encants 

Since 1928, Glòries has been the location of one of Europe's oldest open-air flea markets, known as els Encants Vells or Fira de Bellcaire, which is said to date back to the 14th century, and operates four days a week. The market was formerly housed on an area of land at the north-western side of the square, but as part of the redevelopment of the area a new development has been built at a site at the south-western end of the square, consisting of a multi-level construction to provide covered walkways, modern facilities for the traders, and parking for customers.

The project 
Glòries and its immediate area is planned to become a park with a multitude of services including a public library, a major underground train station (served by RENFE and Ferrocarrils de la Generalitat de Catalunya), a public clinic, a sports centre as well as a museum of design. Integration with other buildings already completed in the area (Teatre Nacional de Catalunya, L'Auditori and Mercat dels Encants) is a key component of proposed redevelopment.

Furthermore, the three major thoroughfares that cross Glòries partially laid underground to make room for open green space.

Buildings and structures

Completed 
 Torre Agbar by Jean Nouvel
 La Farinera del Clot, a cultural centre. The building, a former factory, was recently rebuilt.
 Disseny Hub Barcelona

In progress 
 Complex de Cinemes-Plaça de les Arts, by Zaha Hadid
 Edifici Ona, and administrative building for the city council.

Transportation

Metro 
 Glòries (L1)

Tram 
 Glòries (Trambesòs routes T4 and T5)
 La Farinera (Trambesòs route T5)

In progress 
 The union of the Trambaix and Trambesòs networks by Avinguda Diagonal

Bus 
 Line 7 Diagonal Mar - Zona Universitària
 Line 56 Collblanc - Besòs/Verneda
 Line 60 Pl. Glòries - Zona Universitària
 Line 92 Pg. Marítim - Gràcia
 Line B21 Barcelona (Rda. St. Pere) - Sta. Coloma (Av. Ramon Berenguer IV)
 Line 192 Hospital de Sant Pau - Poblenou

Nit Bus 
 N0 Pl. Portal de la Pau - Pl. Portal de la Pau
 N2 Hospitalet (Av. Carrilet) - Badalona (Via Augusta)
 N7 Pl. Pedralbes - Pl. Llevant (Fòrum)

Bicing 
 Avinguda Diagonal

Transport projects 
A new large station joining the different rail systems of Barcelona has been proposed, but is still under consideration.
 A controversial FGC rail and metro station planned by the Barcelona city council but still not approved by Generalitat de Catalunya.
 A Renfe train station which will probably replace Arc de Triomf train station. It will be served by R1, R3 and R4 Rodalies lines.

Culture 
 Centre Cultural la Farinera del Clot, a theatre.
 Versus Teatre

Events 
 Barcelona Visual Sound, a multimedia festival held in February in different parts of the city, hosts in Glòries its most important acts.

Hotels 
 Hotel Diagonal Barcelona
 Hotel Glories, Padilla 173 - 08013 Barcelona

See also 
 Poblenou
 List of streets and squares in Eixample
 Glòries metro station

 Street names in Barcelona
 Urban planning of Barcelona

References

External links 
 Glòries.cat
 Project dossier at Bcn.cat
 An essay about the history of Glòries
 Glòries tram station (with photos)

El Poblenou
Plazas in Barcelona
Avinguda Diagonal
Gran Via de les Corts Catalanes
Sant Martí (district)